SKAC is the abbreviation of:

 Araracuara Airport, an airport serving Araracuara, Colombia, by ICAO code
 Storm King Art Center in Mountainville, New York, USA, an open-air museum which has extended the concept of a "sculpture garden" to become a "sculpture landscape